Arthur Shannos (4 March 1938 – 1 September 2002) was an Australian weightlifter. He competed at the 1960 Summer Olympics and the 1964 Summer Olympics.

References

External links
 

1938 births
2002 deaths
Australian male weightlifters
Olympic weightlifters of Australia
Weightlifters at the 1960 Summer Olympics
Weightlifters at the 1964 Summer Olympics
Weightlifters from Brisbane
Commonwealth Games medallists in weightlifting
Commonwealth Games gold medallists for Australia
Commonwealth Games silver medallists for Australia
Commonwealth Games bronze medallists for Australia
Weightlifters at the 1958 British Empire and Commonwealth Games
Weightlifters at the 1962 British Empire and Commonwealth Games
Weightlifters at the 1966 British Empire and Commonwealth Games
20th-century Australian people
21st-century Australian people
Medallists at the 1958 British Empire and Commonwealth Games
Medallists at the 1962 British Empire and Commonwealth Games
Medallists at the 1966 British Empire and Commonwealth Games